Ringrose Peak is a mountain on the Alberta—British Columbia border, in Canada.

It is located on the Continental Divide on the border of Banff and Yoho National Parks and is part of the Bow Range of the Banff-Lake Louise Core Area in the Canadian Rockies.

The peak was named in 1894 after Arthur Edmund Leake Ringrose (1852-1924) by Samuel Allen, because previously Allen had met Ringrose, while Allen was visiting the Rockies. Ringrose was visiting from London, England.  Arthur died on the 25th of February 1924 in Middleton Tyas, Richmond, Yorkshire, England. He was buried four days later in the churchyard of St Michael & All Angels, which is just outside the village of Middleton Tyas.

See also
 List of peaks on the Alberta–British Columbia border

References

Three-thousanders of Alberta
Three-thousanders of British Columbia
Canadian Rockies
Great Divide of North America
Mountains of Banff National Park
Mountains of Yoho National Park